Ray DiPierro (1926-2014) was a guard in the National Football League.

DiPierro was born Ramon Frank DiPierro on August 22, 1926 in Toledo, Ohio. He played with the Green Bay Packers for two seasons. He played at the collegiate level at Ohio State University.

DiPierro died on July 20, 2014 in a long term care facility in Perrysburg, Ohio from the complications of Alzheimer's and Parkinson's diseases.  He was 87.

See also
List of Green Bay Packers players

References

Sportspeople from Toledo, Ohio
Green Bay Packers players
American football offensive guards
Ohio State Buckeyes football players
1926 births
2014 deaths